The Wichita Wings were an expansion team for the Major Indoor Soccer League that began play in Hartman Arena, November 2011. The Wichita Wings, in this formation, were a revitalized version of the original Wings franchise that played in the MISL and NPSL for 22 years, before folding in 2001. This incarnation of the Wings shut down after the 2012-13 Major Indoor Soccer League season. They were replaced by a new team called the Wichita B-52s who play in the Professional Arena Soccer League, which later became the Major Arena Soccer League.

Year-by-year

Final squad
Updated February 7, 2012

References

External links
Official website
Wichita Wings Seeking New Ownership

2011 establishments in Kansas
2013 disestablishments in Kansas
Association football clubs established in 2011
Association football clubs disestablished in 2013
Indoor soccer clubs in the United States
Defunct soccer clubs in Kansas
Defunct indoor soccer clubs in the United States
Major Indoor Soccer League (2008–2014) teams
Sports in Wichita, Kansas
Soccer clubs in Kansas